Clinton Falls is an unincorporated community in Clinton Township, Putnam County, in the U.S. state of Indiana.

History
A post office was established at Clinton Falls in 1874, and remained in operation until it was discontinued in 1901. The community was named for rapids by the town site in Clinton Township.

Geography

References

Unincorporated communities in Putnam County, Indiana
Unincorporated communities in Indiana